Timur Acar (born 22 December 1979) is a Turkish actor.

Life and career 
Acar was born and raised in Germany and later moved to Turkey with his family. Following the 1999 İzmit earthquake, the family moved to Karasu. His family are of Georgian descent and originally lived in Batumi. Acar is one of the founders of Moda Sahnesi, a cultural center in Istanbul. He started his career in 1999 by appearing in theatre plays and received his education at Dokuz Eylül University. He rose to prominence through his roles in the series Kurşun Yarası, Avrupa Yakası and Akasya Durağı. In 2013, he starred in the TV series Bebek İşi as Murat. In Kertenkele, he portrayed three different characters simultaneously. He was first married in 2007 but the marriage dissolved in 2009. In July 2016, he married actress Eda Özerkan with whom he has a daughter.

Filmography

References

External links 
 
 

1979 births
Living people
Turkish people of Georgian descent
Turkish male television actors
Turkish male film actors
Turkish male stage actors